Walne is a village in Poland.

Walne may also refer to:

People
Adam Walne, English rugby league footballer
Jordan Walne, English rugby league footballer
Kathleen Walne, English artist